Sarfaryab may refer to:
Sarfaryab District
Sarfaryab Rural District